The women's 800 metres event at the 1985 IAAF World Indoor Games was held at the Palais Omnisports Paris-Bercy on 19 January.

Results

References

800
800 metres at the World Athletics Indoor Championships